Hob Hurst's House is a Bronze Age barrow on Beeley Moor near Bakewell in Derbyshire. It is unique in that instead of the normal round shape, Hob Hurst's barrow is rectangular. Originally made with 13 stones, only five remain today.

It is situated on the highest part of Beeley Moor.

There are numerous prehistoric mounds on these moors, many marking late Neolithic and early Bronze Age burial sites. Built by local families in their fields and open pastures to contain the bones of 'ancestors', the mounds were visible symbols of community sense of place. However Hob Hurst's House is unique with its square central mound, ditch and outer bank.
Hob Hurst's House was one of the first monuments in Britain to be taken into state care, through the Ancient Monuments Protection Act of 1882. The stone bollards inscribed VR that surround the site were erected at that time.
The curious name Hob Hurst's House refers to a mythical hobgoblin who haunted nearby woods.

The barrow was excavated in 1853 by Thomas Bateman, the "Barrow Knight". The dig found a stone-lined grave containing some scorched human bones plus some lead ore.

It is in the guardianship of English Heritage and is a Scheduled Ancient Monument.

The Peak District Boundary Walk runs alongside Gibbet Moor, past Hob Hurst's House and onto Beeley village.

References

External links

  History on Hob Hurst House: English Heritage

Archaeological sites in Derbyshire
Scheduled monuments in Derbyshire
Buildings and structures in Derbyshire
English Heritage sites in Derbyshire